The Collective Soul 2013 Tour was a concert tour by American rock band Collective Soul.

Background
For their 2013 tour, Collective Soul performed fifteen shows total: twelve in the United States, two in Canada, and one in Indonesia. This marked the first time the band performed in Indonesia.

When they weren't touring as a band, the members of Collective Soul were involved in other projects throughout the year:

Frontman Ed Roland toured with the Sweet Tea Project to support their debut album, Devils 'n Darlins.
Rhythm guitarist Dean Roland, alongside Ryan Potesta, are members of Magnets & Ghosts. They embarked on the Light My Flame Tour to support their debut album, Mass.
Bassist Will Turpin, also a solo artist, toured with his backing band, the Way. They performed a Stageit concert held at Real 2 Reel Studios in Jonesboro, Georgia on February 7. This show was recorded and later released as a live EP, The Lighthouse (Live from Real 2 Reel Studios).

Opening acts
Vertical Horizon (Paradise)

Set list
{{hidden
| headercss = background: #ccccff; font-size: 100%; width: 90%;
| contentcss = text-align: left; font-size: 100%; width: 90%;
| header = Jakarta
| content =
"Tremble for My Beloved"
"Heavy"
"Listen"
"December"
"Gel"
"She Said" 
"Why, Pt. 2"
"Where the River Flows"
"Compliment"
"Needs" 
"Hollywood"  
"Better Now"
"Run"
"Precious Declaration"
"The World I Know"
Encore
 "Counting the Days"
 "Shine"
}}

Tour dates

Festivals and other miscellaneous performances
This concert was part of the 2013 Magic Springs Concert Series.
This concert was part of Java Rockin'land.
This concert was part of the Stars & Stripes Festival.
This concert was part of the Thunder Bay Blues Festival. 
This concert was part of the Linn County Fair.
This concert was part of the Ozark Empire Fair.
This concert was part of the Naperville Jaycees Last Fling.
This concert was part of the Panama City Beach Seafood & Music Festival.
This concert was part of the Great Ogeechee Seafood Festival.

Personnel

Band
 Ed Roland – lead vocals, guitar
 Dean Roland – rhythm guitar 
 Will Turpin – bass
 Joel Kosche – lead guitar
 Johnny Rabb – drums, percussion

References

2013 concert tours
Collective Soul concert tours